Winston Spear (born 1965) is a Canadian stand-up comedian and actor originally from Montreal, Quebec.  He is the winner of the  2003 Canadian Comedy Award for Best Male Stand-up and was a member of the cast of sketch comedy shows Comedy Inc. and The Bobroom.

 Winston is known for dancing during his live performances, often to foreign music where he mouths or reacts to the music and lyrics.
 Winston has appeared in the Barenaked Ladies music video "Sound of Your Voice"
Winston was a semi-finalist on Season 6 of Last Comic Standing.

External links
 
 Diamondfield Entertainment

1965 births
Living people
Canadian stand-up comedians
Canadian sketch comedians
Canadian television personalities
Comedians from Montreal
Canadian male comedians
Television personalities from Montreal
20th-century Canadian comedians
21st-century Canadian comedians
Canadian Comedy Award winners